Fiveslivejive is the second studio album to be released by Australian band Ol' 55. The album was recorded in one day at Festival Studios in Sydney on 17 June 1977. The album was released in September 1977 and peaked at number 81 on the Australian Kent Music Report.

Track listing

Charts

References

1977 albums
Ol' 55 (band) albums
Mushroom Records albums